Sursum Corda (Latin: "lift up your hearts") is a small neighborhood located in Washington, D.C., bounded by North Capitol Street on the east, K Street NW to the south, New Jersey Avenue NW to the west, and New York Avenue NW to the north.

The neighborhood draws its name for the Sursum Corda Co-operative Apartments, a 199-unit low-income housing complex constructed in 1968. The area became a notorious open-air drug market plagued by violence and poverty in the 1980s. After a notorious 2004 murder in the neighborhood, demolition and complete renovation of the low-income housing in Sursum Corda was announced in 2007. Little of the redevelopment happened, although extensive demolition occurred.

History
Residential neighborhoods north of Massachusetts Avenue underwent a prolonged decay in the first half of the 20th century. Controversial urban renewal plans of the 1950s and 1960s called for massive demolition of the area, part of it comprising the old Irish American neighborhood of Swampoodle. The plans though were only partially executed.

Sursum Corda Co-operative
Various Masonic and religious organizations took advantage of loan programs of the recently created U.S. Department of Housing and Urban Development (HUD) to build housing for some of the displaced households. A group of Catholic activists from the nearby Gonzaga College High School and the parish of St. Aloysius conceived of a new urban village to house some of the households displaced by the demolitions. They also received support from the D.C. Public Housing Authority and the then-Senator from New York, Robert F. Kennedy.

The leading organizer and founder of the Cooperative was Eugene L. Stewart, an alumnus of Georgetown University. In 1965, Stewart was approached as a member of the Georgetown Alumni Association and asked if the Association would become involved by sponsoring a low income housing project. The idea presented to him was for students and alumni to assist with tutoring the poor and their children in the community. Stewart presented the ideas to the Alumni Board of Governors, but the plan was rejected. He formed Sursum Corda, Inc. and oversaw the construction of the Sursum Corda Cooperative.

Construction on the new development began in 1967. It was named Sursum Corda, a Latin expression meaning "Lift up your hearts" (which is intoned at the start of the Eucharistic Prayer during the Mass). The original plan called for 155 resident-owned and 44 rental townhouses on four acres (16,000 m²), arranged on courtyards and alleys around a horseshoe-shaped street (1st Terrace, L Place, and 1st Place NW) to promote a sense of community. The style was quite unusual for public housing of the era, in that the neighborhood was largely closed off, presaging some of the HOPE VI rehabilitation plans. The units offered amenities such as air conditioning, washer and dryer units, and kitchen garbage disposals. Rents were originally fixed at 25 percent of the residents' income.

A group of nuns from the religious institute of the Religious of the Sacred Heart (R.S.C.J.) were among the first residents, aiming to support and minister to the new residents. Father Horace McKenna, a Jesuit priest at St. Aloysius Church at Gonzaga College High School and well-known advocate for the poor, established a program to bring Georgetown University undergraduate students to tutor children in the neighborhood, a program which continues to the present day. McKenna Walk NW is named for him.

Disadvantageous tax laws led to neglect of the properties, and the arrival of crack cocaine in the 1980s sent the neighborhood into a steep decline. Its layout made it difficult to police, and consequently an ideal drug market and frequent battleground for street gangs. Despite the efforts of the Tenants Association, it became associated with poverty and crime. Even the nuns were driven away, the last departing in the early 1990s.

Other community landmarks
The Sursum Corda neighborhood also contains the Julius Hobson Plaza Condominiums (named for Julius Hobson, a civil rights activist and member of the first elected Council of the District of Columbia), the Severna Apartments, Sibley Plaza, the Turnkey, and the Tyler House Apartments. Sibley Plaza and the Turnkey are both owned by the District of Columbia Housing Authority (DCHA), while the DeSeverna and Tyler House Apartments contain large numbers of units subsidized by the DCHA.

Local landmarks include the Walker-Jones Education Campus (preschool through eighth-grade) on New Jersey Avenue NW between Pierce and L Streets NW and its associated athletic field and basketball courts; the K Street Farm (a  good farm managed by Walker-Jones teachers) on the northwest corner of K Street NW and New Jersey Avenue NW; and the Northwest One Neighborhood Library (built in 2009).

Neighborhood redevelopment
On January 23, 2004, 14-year-old Jahkema "Princess" Hansen was murdered in the Sursum Corda Co-operative. Hansen was involved with 28-year-old Marquette Ward, a known drug dealer. On January 18, 2004, Ward shot and killed 21-year-old Mario J. Evans in a hallway at the Temple Court Apartments for refusing to sell him a discounted drug. Hansen and an 18-year-old girl witnessed the murder. Ward, worried that Hansen would talk to the police, paid 22-year-old Franklin Thompson $8,000 to kill Hansen. While Hansen ate dinner at a friend's apartment in the Sursum Corda Co-op on January 23, Thompson burst into the apartment and opened fire, wounding a 12-year-old girl.  Hansen fled through the apartment. Thompson chased her and shot her twice in the head. Thompson and Ward were both convicted of first-degree murder in 2006.

Hansen's murder, which The Washington Post called "heinous" and "execution-style", shocked many residents of the city and drew attention to the terrible housing conditions and severe crime occurring in the neighborhood. It also prodded city officials to spur redevelopment in the area.

Northwest One project
Determined to change the Sursum Corda neighborhood, the government of the District of Columbia announced a plan to tear down the Sursum Corda Co-op, the Golden Rule housing and retail complex, the Temple Court Apartments, and other nearby buildings and construct a $700 million mixed use housing, office, and retail center for low-income residents. The city said that William C. Smith & Co., Jair Lynch Partners, Banneker Ventures, and Community Preservation Development would lead the project. Dubbed Northwest One, the project would build 1,630 units (spread among apartments, condominiums, and townhouses), rebuild  of retail space, add  of office space, and construct a  health clinic (to be run by Unity Health Clinic). Northwest One would triple the residential density of the area, and increase low-income housing to 571 units from 410 units. An additional $45 million in city funds would be used to rebuild Walker-Jones Elementary School and construct a new branch library in the area.

Little actual redevelopment occurred, although most of the buildings were demolished.  The Sursum Corda co-operative declined to participate in the redevelopment. But the owners of other structures, such as the Golden Rule complex (owned by Bible Way Temple, a nearby church) did. Temple Court Apartments was the largest housing complex in the area, with 520 units. But the Bush Companies, which owned Temple Court, wanted to out of the federal and city government-subsidized low-income housing plans and wanted to convert its units to market-rate housing. The District of Columbia exercised eminent domain over Temple Court, seizing it and ensuring it would not block the Northwest One plan. Demolition of the participating structures occurred in 2008, with residents dispersed to other public housing projects in the city. In 2009, the redeveloped Walker-Jones Education Campus and the Northwest One Neighborhood Library opened.  But then redevelopment stopped. DCHA never assigned anyone to oversee the project, which left no one to push the developers to fulfill their agreement. DCHA itself was required to move from its headquarters at 1133 North Capitol Street NE to vacate and demolish its own headquarters to make way for the planned new housing, but the agency never did so.  DCHA then lost the blueprints for the project, and only relocated them in June 2013. DCHA then discovered—after it had demolished the building—that the Temple Court Apartments were built with a mortgage insured by the United States Department of Housing and Urban Development. This $3.9 million insurance policy required that only subsidized housing could be built on the Temple Court land, but the Northwest One project envisioned market-rate, office, and retail use there. Mayor Adrian Fenty and Mayor Vincent C. Gray both pledged to resolve the issue, but never did.  Only two of the many planned Northwest One buildings were constructed.  One was the 2M Street Apartments at 2 M Street NE. Built with $16.8 million in DCHA funds, only 93 of its 314 units are subsidized for low-income residents. The other was the Severna Apartments, owned and built by Bible Way Temple. The $15.7 million building (constructed with $1.9 million in DCHA funds) opened in 2011. All of its units are for low-income residents.

The construction of the nearby NoMa - Gallaudet University Metro station and a surge in property values sparked redevelopment of the area.

New Sursum Corda project
In August 2015, Sursum Corda Cooperative Association announced it had partnered with Winn Development Co. and adjacent private landowners in the neighborhood to redevelop the Sursum Corda co-op and the surrounding  of land into a new high-density, mixed use housing development. The development, which will occur in two phases, will contain more than 1,100 apartments, six times the co-op's current capacity. The first phase, constructed on the parcel at L and 1st Streets NE, will contain three buildings of 164 units, 166 units, and 100 units. The second phase, located at the site of the current Sursum Corda Co-operative Apartments, will see two buildings of 339 units and 373 units.

Starting in November 2018, Toll Brothers development began demolition paving the way for the re-development.

References
Notes

Citations

Further reading
 Hirsch, John C. "Sursum Corda," American Studies Newsletter, Georgetown University, Spring 2005, p. 11.
 Montgomery, Lori. "Some of D.C.'s Poor Question Their Place in Housing Plan," Washington Post, May 16, 2005, p.A1.

External links
 Sursum Corda, official D.C. Housing Authority site

Neighborhoods in Northwest (Washington, D.C.)
Public housing in the United States
Residential buildings completed in 1968
1968 establishments in Washington, D.C.